Ton Caanen (born March 18, 1966 in Geleen, Netherlands) is a Dutch football manager.

Managerial career
Aside from a few years in the amateur Dutch leagues, Caanen never played professional football. He got his start as a manager in his hometown club FC Geleen Zuid while also working as a salesman for the local Toyota dealership. 

After two years with FC Geleen Zuid he started to work as the youth manager of Roda JC.

Metalurh Donetsk
In January 2004 he made his way to the Ukrainian Premier League as he signed as manager of Metalurh Donetsk. He left the club at the end of the season.

Beitar Jerusalem
When Arcadi Gaydamak bought the Israeli football club, Beitar Jerusalem, he looked for someone who would be able to give the club a look over and see what changes needed to be made. Caanen was brought in and after a short time was given the reigns of the club after Eli Ohana, stepped down from the manager position. 

Continuing with the same squad as Ohana had, Kaanen was able to produce good results making him a 'lifeline' to hopes in the club that they would be able to qualify for a continental competition (UEFA Champions League or UEFA Cup). When Luis Fernandez was appointed general manager over Caanen, there was a lot of friction over Caanen's qualifications to manage a club looking to become a European power. Caanen was soon fired but made a lasting impression on the Israeli public that would later pay dividends.

Replacing Nir Klinger
When the Maccabi Tel Aviv boardroom had enough of the poor results on the pitch during the club's 100 year anniversary, it was evident that Israeli manager Nir Klinger was on his way out. Caanen was appointed interim manager. Despite two big money "name" signings the team were a disaster typified by a 4–0 loss to Second Division Hapoel Akko in the Cup.

Maccabi Netanya
On 4 June 2006, Caanen was appointed as the manager of Maccabi Netanya but never managed a single game after being sacked a week later.

FC Stal Alchevsk
Caanen made a quick return to management later that month with a one-year deal to manage Ukrainian Premier League club Stal Alchevsk.

Valletta
In June 2009 Caanen signed a contract as the coach of the Maltese club Valletta. "The objective in the country is the championship and the connection to get to Europe", said Caanen in Limburg. He took Jordi Cruyff with him to the island as an assistant coach and player. The two worked before together at Metalurh Donetsk.

AEK Larnaca
In summer of 2010 Jordi Cruyff announced his retirement from professional football and joined AEK Larnaca as Director of Football. He signed Caanen as head coach, and the pair worked to establish the team as a new football powerhouse in Cyprus.

Veria
On September 1, 2013 the Greek superleague side Veria F.C. announced that Caanen was appointed as the team coach. After a few weeks he quit.

Aris Limassol F.C.
At the end of October 2013, he signed with Aris Limassol F.C. until the end of the season.

De Treffers
In June 2014, Caanen became manager of Dutch Topklasse side De Treffers.

Managerial stats

Honours

As a Manager
Maltese Cup
 Winner (1): 2009–10
Maltese Premier League
 Runner-up (1): 2009-10

References

1966 births
Living people
People from Geleen
Dutch football managers
FC Metalurh Donetsk managers
Beitar Jerusalem F.C. managers
Maccabi Tel Aviv F.C. managers
FC Stal Alchevsk managers
Valletta F.C. managers
AEK Larnaca FC managers
Enosis Neon Paralimni FC managers
Veria F.C. managers
Aris Limassol FC managers
Apollon Limassol FC managers
Israeli Premier League managers
Ukrainian Premier League managers
Dutch expatriate football managers
Expatriate football managers in Ukraine
Expatriate football managers in Israel
Expatriate football managers in Malta
Expatriate football managers in Cyprus
Expatriate football managers in Greece
Dutch expatriate sportspeople in Ukraine
Dutch expatriate sportspeople in Israel
Dutch expatriate sportspeople in Malta
Dutch expatriate sportspeople in Cyprus
Dutch expatriate sportspeople in Greece
De Treffers managers
Footballers from Limburg (Netherlands)
Be Quick 1887 players
Roda JC Kerkrade non-playing staff
Dutch expatriate sportspeople in Slovakia
Expatriate football managers in Slovakia
FK Senica managers